Mysterium may refer to:

 Mysterium (John Zorn album), 2005
 Mysterium (Manilla Road album), 2013
 Mysterium (board game), a cooperative board game designed by Oleksandr Nevskiy and Oleg Sidorenko
 Mysterium (novel), an alternate history novel by Robert Charles Wilson
 Mysterium (Scriabin), an unfinished work by the Russian composer Alexander Scriabin
Mysterium, seventh part of composer Georges Lentz’ musical cycle Caeli enarrant...
 Mysterium (video game), a video game published in 1991
 An annual conference concerned with the Myst series of computer games
 Greco-Roman mysteries, religious schools for which participation was reserved to initiates

See also
 Mysteria (disambiguation)
 Mystery (disambiguation)
 Mysterium fidei (disambiguation)